Timur Aleksandrovich Ismagilov (born 27 February 1982) is a Russian Bashkir composer and pianist. In his music he combines various composition techniques with a sustained interest in traditional Tatar and Bashkir melodic language.

Biography 
Timur Ismagilov was born in Ufa (Bashkortostan, Russia). As a child he taught himself to play all the musical instruments that were available at home: the piano and different types of accordion (bayan,  talyanka, saratovskaya). He also performed and recorded as a singer of Tatar and Bashkir songs. 

Ismagilov started to compose music at the age of 11 and attended Rustem Sabitov's composition class in 1995–2000. He graduated from the Lyceum of Ufa State Institute of Arts (Lyudmila Alexeeva's piano class).  In 2005 he graduated from Alexander Tchaikovsky's composition class at the Moscow Conservatory. 

In 2005–2008 he took a postgraduate course in the conservatory (academic advisor Alexander Tchaikovsky, scientific advisor Svetlana Savenko). The result was a musicological work titled "DSCH. Sketch of a Monograph about the Monogram". An article based on this study was published in Berlin in 2013.

In 2006 Timur Ismagilov founded the Sviatoslav Richter's memorial website. He has been organizing contemporary music concerts since 2010, and became one of the composers interviewed by Dmitry Bavilskiy for the book “To be called for: Conversations with contemporary composers” (published in 2014). Besides composing his own music, Ismagilov has made about 600 transcriptions and arrangements for different sets of instruments.

Works 
Orchestral music
 Concerto for cello and orchestra, op. 17 (2004–05)
 Elegy for string orchestra, op. 40 (2011, 2017)
 Changes II for piano, 15 strings and triangle ad libitum, op. 42 (2016–17)
 Addiction for orchestra, op. 44 (2018)

Chamber music
 Triptych for string quartet, op. 4 (1996)
 Epitaph for Alfred Schnittke for string quartet, piano and celesta, op. 6 (1998, rev. 2022)
 String Quartet, op. 14 (2002–03, rev. 2006)
 Fantasia for Violin and Piano, op. 16 (2003–04)
 EDES... for flute, clarinet, violin, cello and prepared piano, op. 20 (2007)
 Ozon kiy  (Bashkir: Оҙон көй) for accordion, flute, clarinet, trumpet, violin, viola, cello and double bass, op. 21 (2008)
 Two Sketches and a Song for cello solo, op. 22 (2010)
 Novella for viola solo, op. 23 (2010)
 Evening Music for flute, violin, viola and cello, op. 24 (2010)
 Dialogue for violin solo, op. 27 (2011)
 Trio for violin, cello and piano, op. 31 (2013)
 Jacob's Ladder for double bass solo, op. 35 (2014)
 Sonata for Violin and Piano, op. 36 (2015)
 The Story of Dove for flute solo, op. 39 (2016)
 Fantasia for Clavichord (or piano), op. 43 (2018)
 Fantasia for Viola and Piano, op. 46 (2019–20)
 Fuga Idearum for flute, clarinet, violin, viola, cello and piano, op. 50 (2014, 2021–22)

Vocal music
 Four Japanese Poems for soprano and piano, op. 7 (1998)
 From Mustai Karim, diptych for male voice and piano, op. 9 (1999)
 The Story of One Picture after Arkady Averchenko for male voice, cello, piano, prepared piano and tape, op. 11 (2001)
 121, vocal cycle after poems by Dmitry Prigov for male voice and piano, op. 15 (2003)
 From Hafez, vocal cycle for soprano and piano, op. 26 (2011)
 Three Epigrams for low male voice and piano, op. 41 (1999, 2017)

Piano music
 Suite in Folk Style, op. 1 (1995–96)
 Variations on a Folk Theme, op. 2 (1995–96)
 Partita-Offering, op. 10 (2000)
 Homage to John Cage, op. 12 (2001)
 Variations on a Theme of Paganini, op. 13 (2002, rev. 2003)
 24 Preludes, op. 18 (2005–10)
 Yashen  (Bashkir: Йәшен) after the poem by Rashit Nazarov, op. 25 (2011)
 Bagatelles, op. 28 (2012)
 Axis, op. 32 (2012–13)
 Changes, op. 33 (2013)
 7, op. 34 (2014)
 Three Pieces for Six Hands, op. 37 (2010–16)
 Spring Sketches, op. 38 (2016)
 What Next? ор. 47 (2020)
 Loneliness, ор. 48 (2020)
 Solitude, ор. 49 (2021)

Notes

External links
 Timur Ismagilov's sheet music on IMSLP
 YouTube channel
 Interview for the channel Moving Classics TV, 2022

Living people
1982 births
Russian classical composers
Russian male classical composers
21st-century classical composers
Musicians from Ufa
Moscow Conservatory alumni
21st-century Russian male musicians